NBA Live 99 is the fifth installment of the NBA Live video games series. The cover features Antoine Walker of the Boston Celtics. The game was developed by EA Sports and released on November 4, 1998, for the Nintendo 64, and then on November 10, 1998, for the Windows and PlayStation. Don Poier is the play-by-play announcer. It was the first NBA Live game released for Nintendo 64. NBA Live 99 was followed by NBA Live 2000.

Summary
NBA Live 99 is EA Sports' NBA release for the 1998–99 NBA season. Major additions include Practice Mode and multi-season play, which features player development between seasons. Although free agency or generated rookies were not included, this would be the forerunner to Franchise Mode.

Live 99 was shipped with 1997–98 NBA season rosters due to the 1998–99 NBA lockout, putting a hold on player movements and rookie signings during the summer of 1998. Prominent bugs led to the NBA Live Series Center fan site submitting a patch petition to EA Sports, resulting in two official patches which included roster updates for the 98–99 season.

As Live 99 kept the same file formats as Live 98, patchers were able to produce the same wide variety of patches using an updated version of the EA Graphics Editor and the NBA Live 99 Toolkit.

Features
LIVE Hoops
 Fresh new moves, including jab steps, fake passes and aggressive rebounding, plus high-flying new dunks.
 Real NBA stats, real NBA players, real NBA moves.
 Create a dynasty with new multiple seasons - players evolve over time.
 Enhanced GM mode with full NBA draft and realistic computer trading.

LIVE Technology
 New Sports Ticker via the Internet - check NBA scores as you play.
 Unreal 3D graphics with real-time lighting and hundreds of animations.
 Unbelievable player detail, including fully modeled heads and facial animations.

LIVE Style
 New Pro-Action AI includes smarter, more realistic player reactions.
 TV presentation - moving cameras focus on player highlights.
 New enhanced Play-by-Play and Color Commentary.

Platform differences
The Nintendo 64 version is an updated port of NBA Live 98, which differs from the PC and PlayStation versions. The PC and PlayStation versions also featured a bug where players did not fatigue properly. The bug in the PC version was eventually patched.

Reception

The game received "favorable" reviews on all platforms according to video game review aggregator GameRankings. AllGame gave the PC version four stars out of five, saying that the game delivers "a full basketball experience. Multiple seasons could literally keep a player busy for years which makes one wonder if anyone will really need the next version." Computer Games Strategy Plus gave the same PC version three stars out of five, however, saying, "there's little compelling reason to choose NBA Live 99 over its previous version. Unlike the amazing FIFA games, the pressure to deliver an all-new game on a yearly basis is causing the NBA Live franchise to spin its wheels." In Japan, where the PlayStation version was ported for release on April 28, 1999, Famitsu gave it a score of 28 out of 40.

The PC version was nominated for the "Best Sports Game of the Year" award at IGNs Best of 1998 Awards, which ultimately went to NFL Blitz. It was also nominated for the "Sports Game of the Year" award at GameSpots Best & Worst of 1998 Awards, which ultimately went to FIFA 99. However, it won the award for "Best Sports Game" at the Fifth Annual PC Gamer Awards.

Notes
 Due to the NBA lockout, Live 99 featured final 1997–98 rosters accurate as of July 1, 1998, rather than early 1998–99 rosters featuring the draft class of 1998. EA Sports released two official patches, the first updating the rosters, adding the 50 game schedule and addressing several gameplay issues, while the second served as a midseason roster update.
 Multi-season play and Practice Mode were introduced in Live 99.
 Prior to the official roster update, Michael Jordan was once again represented by a "Roster Player" for the Chicago Bulls.

References

External links
 

1998 video games
Electronic Arts games
NBA Live
NuFX games
Windows games
PlayStation (console) games
Nintendo 64 games
Video games developed in Canada
Video games set in 1998
Video games set in 1999